The Djinguereber Mosque in Timbuktu, Mali is a famous learning center of Mali built in 1327, and cited as Djingareyber or Djingarey Ber in various languages. Its design is accredited to Abu Ishaq Al Sahili who was paid 200 kg (40,000 mithqals) of gold by Musa I of Mali, emperor of the Mali Empire. According to Ibn Khaldun, one of the best known sources for 14th century Mali, al-Sahili was given 12,000 mithkals of gold dust for his designing and building of the djinguereber in Timbuktu. But more reasoned analysis suggests that his role, if any, was quite limited. The architectural crafts in Granada had reached their zenith by the fourteenth century, and it is extremely unlikely that a cultured and wealthy poet would have had anything more than a dilettante's knowledge of the intricacies of contemporary architectural practice.

Except for a small part of the northern facade, which was reinforced in the 1960s in alhore (limestone blocks, also widely used in the rest of the town), and the minaret, also built in limestone and rendered with mud, the Djingareyber Mosque is made entirely of earth plus organic materials such as fibre, straw and wood. It has three inner courts, two minarets and twenty-five rows of pillars aligned in an east-west direction and prayer space for 2,000 people.

Djinguereber is one of four madrassas composing the University of Timbuktu. It was inscribed on the list of UNESCO World Heritage Sites in 1988, and in 1990 was considered to be in danger due to sand encroachment. A four-year project towards the restoration and rehabilitation of the Mosque began in June 2006, and is being conducted and financed by the Aga Khan Trust for Culture.

On 26 February 2010, during Mawlid (a festival to mark the birth anniversary of Muhammad), a stampede at the mosque killed around 26 people and injured at least 55 others, mostly women and children.

Attack in 2012 

On 1 July 2012, militant islamists of the Ansar Dine ("defenders of faith") began destroying the tombs of Timbuktu shortly after UNESCO placed them on a list of endangered World Heritage sites. They set about destroying  seven of Timbuktu's total sixteen ancient Muslim saint shrines, including two tombs at the Djingareyber Mosque. Using "hoes, pick-axes and chisels, they hammered away at the two earthen tombs until they were completely destroyed".  The damage to the mosque itself, however, was minimal.

Preservation 
Desertification is defined by UNESCO as, “degradation in arid, semi-arid, dry sub-humid area resulting from various factors, including climatic variations and human activities.”

Between 1901 and 1996, temperature rose by 1.4 degrees Celsius in the area, which enhanced desert encroachment, as well as sand blown damages. Efforts to repair and raise the walls of the mosque have been ongoing, but there is still a one-meter difference between the roof height in 1952 and today.

While drought may cause issues, too much rain has also shown to be detrimental to the mosque. Heavy rains in 1999, 2001, and 2003 caused the collapse of many traditionally built earthen buildings, as well as more recently built structures. As our delicately balanced climate fluctuates due to climate change, world heritage sites such as the Djingareyber mosque have suffered.

The State Party was requested at the last World Heritage Committee to provide all technical documents on the proposed new 4-year restoration project for the Djingareyber Mosque, being carried out by the Aga Khan Trust for Culture. However, no documents had been received before the mission and in its report the State Party gave few details of this major project.

The mission noted that the first phase of restoration work was a pilot project undertaken from November 2006 to July 2007. This work had included drainage and paving around the mosque, re-rendering walls in bad condition and in one zone of the roof, replacing around 50% of the beams, above which was a heavy build-up of mud plaster. The masons in charge of the project locally clearly have good technical expertise; however, there is a need to document what they are doing on an on-going basis and to record the starting point for their work.

However, it is important to note that a balance between new technical solutions and preserving traditional and regular practices of maintenance of the mosque which were typically carried out by local craftsmen must be found.

Natural local trees that were originally used for building materials for the beams in the mosque have also disappeared due to climate change, so wood beams must be imported from Ghana. This drastically increases the price of resources needed to restore the mosque, as building materials aren't readily available anymore.

3D Model with Laser-Scanning 
The Zamani Project documents cultural heritage sites in 3D to create a record for future generations. The documentation of the Djinguereber Mosque is based on terrestrial laser-scanning. The 3D documentation of the Djinguereber Mosque was carried out in 2005. A 3D model, plans and images can be viewed here.

See also
  Lists of mosques 
  List of mosques in Africa
  List of mosques in Egypt

References

Translated from Ibn Khaldun, loc. cit., p. 348.

External links

 Photos/Pictures of Timbuktu, Mali

Religious buildings and structures completed in 1327
14th-century mosques
Timbuktu
Aga Khan Trust for Culture projects
Mosques in Mali
Madrasas in Mali
Sudano-Sahelian architecture